Anne DeGrace is a Canadian fiction writer and illustrator who lives near Nelson, British Columbia. She has published four novels and co-authored three photo books.

Biography
Born in Ottawa, Ontario, DeGrace moved to Nelson in 1981.

DeGrace has used themes from Canadian history in her novels, which were originally published by McArthur & Co. and later represented by Cormorant Books.

Treading Water (2005) was the selected title for the One Book, One Kootenay project in 2010. Wind Tails (2007), published as Far From Home by HarperCollins in the U.S., was shortlisted for the Evergreen Award. Sounding Line (2009) was a Chapters/Indigo Heather's Pick. Flying with Amelia was published in hardcover by McArthur & Company in 2011, and in trade paperback by Cormorant Books in 2014.

In 2011, DeGrace was named Nelson's third Cultural Ambassador. She has been a columnist for Nelson newspapers since 1989. She has illustrated several books for children, primarily for Polestar Press and Bluefield Books. As an editor and publishing consultant she has worked to produce several historical and local interest books.

Bibliography 
 Nelson British Columbia in Photographs. (with Steve Thornton) Nelson: Ward Creek Press, 1996. 
 The West Kootenay in Photographs. (with Steve Thornton) Nelson: Ward Creek Press, 1997. 
 Treading Water. Toronto: McArthur & Co, 2005. 
 Wind Tails. Toronto: McArthur & Co., 2007. 
 Sounding Line. Toronto: McArthur & Co., 2009. 
 Far From Home. (published in Canada as Wind Tails.) HarperCollins/Avon, 2009. 
 Nelson British Columbia. (with Steve Thornton) Nelson: Ward Creek Press, 2010. 
 Flying with Amelia. Toronto: McArthur & Co., 2011.

References

External links 
 Official Website
 Anne DeGrace at Cormorant Books
 Anne DeGrace at HarperCollins Publishers

People from Nelson, British Columbia
Writers from British Columbia
Writers from Ottawa
Living people
Canadian children's book illustrators
Canadian women novelists
Canadian women illustrators
20th-century Canadian novelists
20th-century Canadian women writers
21st-century Canadian women writers
21st-century Canadian novelists
Year of birth missing (living people)